Anime NYC is an annual three-day anime convention held during November at the Jacob K. Javits Convention Center in New York City.

Programming
The convention typically offers arcade games, an artist alley, concerts, manga library (Carolina Manga Library), masquerade, panels, screenings, vendors, and video and card games. Anime NYC offered 100 hours of programming in 2017.

History
Anime NYC's organizer LeftField Media was founded by the creators of New York Comic Con, and also run Washington DC's Awesome Con. New York was chosen for the event due to its lack of a large anime convention. The first Anime NYC took over a year to plan and used two halls in the convention center. In the convention's first year, they did not use the amount of space used by New York Comic Con. New York City declared an Anime NYC Weekend for the 2017 convention. Anime NYC added more floor space in 2018, with additional expansion planned in 2019. The convention also hosted Anisong World Matsuri at the Hammerstein Ballroom.

In 2019, Anime NYC used all of the Javits main event space. Artists alley was moved into the dealer's hall, which was doubled in size. New York City Councilmen Ben Kallos and Kanji Yamanouchi, Japan's UN representative both attended the event. Anime NYC 2020 was cancelled due to the COVID-19 pandemic. An online convention was hosted by Anime NYC and NTWRK from November 17–20, 2020 as the convention's replacement.

Anime NYC 2021 required proof of vaccination against COVID-19 and masking. The convention sold out of several badge tiers prior to the event occurring and the Artists Alley was located in its own space for the first time. Registration had long wait times on Friday, with the line being several blocks long, due to a significant number of attendees arriving early. The event made entrance changes for Saturday and Sunday that largely resolved the line issues. In early December, the convention made the national news as an attendee from Minnesota contracted the Omicron variant of COVID-19, and several government officials suggested that all attendees get tested. The CDC in February 2022 reported that Anime NYC did not cause significant transmission of COVID-19, with various protective measures being largely effective.

Event history

See also
 Big Apple Anime Fest
 New York Anime Festival
 List of anime conventions

References

External links
 

2017 establishments in New York City
Anime conventions in the United States
Annual events in New York City
Conventions in New York City
Culture of Manhattan
Festivals in New York City
November events
Recurring events established in 2017